Gwadar Cricket Stadium, officially known as Senator Muhammad Ishaq Baloch Cricket Stadium, is a cricket ground in Gwadar, Pakistan. Construction started in 1998, and was inaugurated in 2020. Currently the stadium only holds domestic games in local competitions. Nearby limestone hills and cliffs tower over the western side of the ground.

References

External links
 

Cricket grounds in Pakistan